Bubù (also known as Bubu) is a 1971 Italian historical drama film directed by Mauro Bolognini.  The film is a transposition, set in Milan and Turin, of the novel Bubu de Montparnasse by Charles-Louis Philippe.

Cast 
 Massimo Ranieri: Piero 
 Ottavia Piccolo: Berta 
 Antonio Falsi: Bubu 
 Gigi Proietti: Giulio, the thief

References

External links 
 

1971 films
Films directed by Mauro Bolognini
Films scored by Carlo Rustichelli
Italian drama films
Films set in Milan
Films set in Turin
1970s Italian-language films
1970s Italian films